Shaoxing East railway station, formerly known as Shangyu North railway station, is a railway station on the Hangzhou–Ningbo high-speed railway located in Shangyu District, Shaoxing, Zhejiang, China.

See also
Shaoxing North railway station
Shaoxing railway station

Railway stations in Zhejiang
Shangyu
Shaoxing